Abid Khan also known as Muhammad Abid Khan (1953–2000) was a Pakistani comedian, stage and TV actor.

References 

1953 births
People from Gujranwala
People from Lahore
Pakistani male television actors
Pakistani male stage actors
Pakistani male comedians
Pakistani Sunni Muslims
Punjabi people
2000 deaths
20th-century comedians